International Conference on Defects in Semiconductors (ICDS) is a long running series of scientific meetings which focuses on research into point and extended defects in semiconductors. It developed as a spin off from the International Conference on the Physics of Semiconductors, remaining a satellite meeting from the first conference on Radiation Effects in
Semiconductors in Gatlinburg in 1959 (now known as ICDS 1) until becoming a separate meeting for ICDS 16. The ICDS covers both basic and applied research topics, with special emphasis on applications of results to semiconducting materials and semiconductors-based device functionality. Traditionally, the ICDS has been held every 2 years in various cities around the world with frequent associated proceedings. A previous conference (ICDS 29) was held in Matsue, Japan, from 31 July to 4 August 2017 and was attended by researchers from 32 countries.

ICDS 31 was hosted by the University of Oslo between 25 and 30 July 2021. Its proceedings was published as part of a special topic issue of the Journal of Applied Physics.

The next ICDS (the 32nd) will be in Rehoboth Beach, Delaware, September 10-15th, 2023.

Corbett Prize 

The Corbett Prize is awarded at the meetings to a young scientist for an outstanding contribution given at the ICDS. The prize is named in memory of James W. Corbett, one of the pioneers in the field of defects in semiconductors, who was known for helping and encouraging young researchers. The prize has been awarded at every ICDS since 1995.

Recipients

Conference locations 

The ICDS venue often rotates between locations in Europe, North America and the far East.

Related Conferences 

 The Gordon Research Conferences host a regular semiconductor defect meeting in alternating years to the ICDS.
 The Extended Defects in Semiconductors conference (EDS) is in alternating years to the ICDS.

See also 
 Semiconductors
 Doping (semiconductor)
 Crystallographic defect

References 

Physics conferences
Technology conferences